Regent Records is a United Kingdom choral music and organ record label and production company based in Wolverhampton.

Founded in 1987 by Gary Cole, the label is run by Gary and Pippa Cole. It currently has nearly 150 commercial releases. In addition the company has produced over 200 projects for private clients and over 250 recordings for release on other major labels. 

In the last two years the company has received three Editor's Choices in Gramophone (UK), three recordings were selected as Critic's Choices in the Jan/Feb 2013 edition of The American Record Guide, and in 2010 one of its releases was a 'Record of the Year' in The Absolute Sound (US).

The label mainly works with the UK's foremost Cathedral choirs, including the choirs of Wells, Winchester, Truro, York and Hereford, Bath Abbey, the Saint Louis Chamber Chorus, the choirs of Selwyn, Christ's and Emmanuel Colleges in Cambridge, and outstanding organists including Thomas Trotter.

External links
 

British record labels
Wolverhampton